This is the progression of world record improvements of the 4 × 400 metres relay W55 division of Masters athletics.

Key

References

Masters athletics world record progressions